Matthews Stone Company Historic District is a national historic district located in Richland Township, Monroe County, Indiana.  The district encompasses five contributing buildings, one contributing site, six contributing structures, and two contributing objects associated with the Matthews Brothers Stone Company limestone business, now operated as Bybee Stone Company, Inc.  The district developed between about 1862 and 1962, and include notable examples of Second Empire and Tudor Revival style architecture.  The contributing resources include the Matthews Mansion (aka Graymont, 1880), Company Store Building (c. 1874), Primary Mill Building (1908), Drafting Building (1920), Administration Building (c. 1931), and two pump houses (c. 1935, c. 1955).

It was listed on the National Register of Historic Places in 2013.

References

External links
Bybee Stone Company, Inc. website

Historic districts on the National Register of Historic Places in Indiana
Industrial buildings and structures on the National Register of Historic Places in Indiana
Second Empire architecture in Indiana
Tudor Revival architecture in Indiana
Buildings and structures in Monroe County, Indiana
Historic districts in Monroe County, Indiana
National Register of Historic Places in Monroe County, Indiana
Limestone industry